The Men's madison was one of the 6 men's events at the 2010 European Track Championships, held in Pruszków, Poland.

18 teams participated in the contest.

The event was held on November 7.

Results

References

Result

Men's madison
European Track Championships – Men's madison